Mark Gilliand is a former Canadian international lawn bowler.

Bowls career
Gilliland has represented Canada at the Commonwealth Games, in the singles at the 1994 Commonwealth Games.

He won two medals at the Asia Pacific Bowls Championships including a gold medal in the pairs at the 1993 event in Victoria.

He is the five times Canadian lawn bowling singles champion (1983, 1991, 1992, 1993, 1995).

References

Canadian male bowls players
Living people
Bowls players at the 1994 Commonwealth Games
Year of birth missing (living people)